Akali Ratan Singh Bhangu Nihang was a Sikh historian and Nihang who wrote about the Sikhs' struggles and rise to power in North India, in his book Prachin Panth Prakash. This work describes how the Sikh people came to dominate Punjab in the 1700s and remains one of the few historical accounts of the era.

Life 
Bhangu was born in the late 1700s, but the exact date is unknown. His grandfather, Sardar Mehtab Singh Mirankotia, was a famous Sikh warrior who helped save the Golden Temple from marauders. He began his work as a historian in 1809, and died in 1846 at the Battle of Sobraon.

Panth Prakash 

Bhangu is primarily know for his historical text, Prachin Panth Prakash (Gurmukhi: ਪ੍ਰਾਚੀਨ ਪੰਥ ਪ੍ਰਕਾਸ਼). He was approached by the British East India Company who wished to know how the Sikhs rose to power in the Punjab Region. He began his historical book in 1809 and completed it in 1841. The original manuscript was discovered in 1914 and published that year.

Bhangu was a member of the ruling Sikh aristocracy and had first-hand knowledge of the struggle and success of the Khalsa. Due to lack of written records at the time, the work was primarily compiled from oral histories, including interviews, family history, and information collected from British and French officers in Punjab. The work describes how the Sikh people successfully came to rule over Punjab. This work remains to this day one of the only historical accounts of the Sikh people during this era.

See Also 
Suraj Parkash

References

Indian Sikhs
19th-century Indian historians
1846 deaths
Year of birth unknown
Nihang